Cliff jumping is jumping off a cliff as a form of sport. When done without equipment, it may be also known as tombstoning. It forms part of the sport of coastal exploration or "coasteering".  When performed with a parachute, it is known as BASE jumping. In 2015 a world record for cliff jumping was set by Laso Schaller, with a jump of 58.8 m (193 ft).

Popular cliff jumping locations 
 Ponte Brolla, Italy
 Playa Forti, Curaçao
 Diving Board Island, Bermuda
 South Point, Hawaii
 Negril, Jamaica 
 Possum Kingdom Lake, Texas
 Clarence Cove, Bermuda
 Nusa Lembongan, Bali 
 Laie Point, Hawaii
 Amoudi Bay, Greece

See also 
 Jumping platform
 Red Bull Cliff Diving World Series

References

Sources

Outdoor recreation
Jumping sports
Diving (sport)